Hybrizon is the genus in the subfamily Hybrizontinae of ichneumonid parasitoid wasps. The subfamily was previously called Paxylommatinae, and has in the past been considered part Braconidae, or a separate family altogether.

Description and distribution 
Hybrizon lacks the 2m-cu crossvein present in most other ichneumonids. It is a small and slender wasp with short palpi and fused 2nd and 3rd metasomal segments.

This genus has a holarctic distribution.

Biology  
Hybrizon is unusual in that it is an endoparasitoid of ants. Female wasps oviposit into larval ants while they are being transported outside of the nest by worker ants. Oviposition is carried out very quickly, in less than one second. Immature Hybrizon pupate within the ant nest without spinning a cocoon.

References

External links 
 Photos on BugGuide
 DNA barcodes at BOLD systems

Ichneumonidae
Apocrita subfamilies
Monotypic animal subfamilies